The Vijay for Best Director is given by STAR Vijay as part of its annual Vijay Awards ceremony for Tamil  (Kollywood) films.

The list
Here is a list of the award winners and the films for which they won.

Nominations
2007 Vetrimaaran - Polladhavan
Ameer - Paruthiveeran
Radha Mohan - Mozhi
Ram - Katrathu Tamil
Venkat Prabhu - Chennai 600028
2008 M. Sasikumar - Subramaniyapuram
Gautham Vasudev Menon - Vaaranam Aayiram 
Myshkin - Anjathey 
Radha Mohan - Abhiyum Naanum
Sasi - Poo
2009 Bala - Naan Kadavul
Cheran - Pokkisham
Pandiraj - Pasanga
Priyadarshan - Kanchivaram
Samudrakani - Naadodigal
2010 Vasanthabalan - Angadi Theru
A. L. Vijay - Madrasapattinam
Gautham Vasudev Menon - Vinnaithaandi Varuvaayaa
Prabu Solomon - Mynaa
Seenu Ramasamy - Thenmerku Paruvakaatru
2011 Vetrimaaran - Aadukalam
A. Sarkunam - Vaagai Sooda Vaa
M. Saravanan - Engaeyum Eppothum
Santha Kumar - Mounaguru
Thiagarajan Kumararaja - Aaranya Kaandam
2012 Balaji Sakthivel - Vazhakku Enn 18/9
A. R. Murugadoss - Thuppakki
Magizh Thirumeni  - Thadaiyara Thaakka
Prabhu Solomon - Kumki
S. S. Rajamouli - Naan Ee
 2013 Bala - Paradesi
Balu Mahendra - Thalaimuraigal
Kamal Haasan - Vishwaroopam
Suseenthiran - Pandiya Naadu
Ram - Thanga Meenkal
 2014 Karthik Subbaraj - Jigarthanda
Mysskin - Pisasu
Pa. Ranjith - Madras
R. Parthiepan - Kathai Thiraikathai Vasanam Iyakkam
Vijay Milton - Goli Soda

See also
 Tamil cinema
 Cinema of India

References

Director